The men's 3000 metres steeplechase event at the 2014 Asian Games was held at the Incheon Asiad Main Stadium, Incheon, South Korea on 29 September.

Schedule
All times are Korea Standard Time (UTC+09:00)

Records

Results

References

Results

Steeplechase men
2014 men